Chorionic (plate) vessels, also fetal surface vessels are blood vessels, including both arteries and veins, that carry blood through the chorion in the fetoplacental circulation. 
Chorionic arteries branch off the umbilical artery, and supply the capillaries of the chorionic villi. Increased vasocontractility of chorionic arteries may contribute to preeclampsia.

References

Embryology of cardiovascular system